Season one of Seinfeld, an American television series created by Jerry Seinfeld and Larry David, began airing on July 5, 1989, on NBC. Originally called The Seinfeld Chronicles, its name was shortened to Seinfeld after the pilot to avoid confusion with another sitcom called The Marshall Chronicles. The season finale aired on June 21, 1990.

A Seasons 1 & 2 DVD box set was released by Sony Pictures Home Entertainment in the United States and Canada on November 23, 2004, thirteen years after it had completed broadcast on television. In addition to every episode from the two seasons, the DVD release features bonus material, including deleted scenes, animatics, exclusive stand-up material, and commentaries. With only four episodes after the pilot, season one of Seinfeld is one of the smallest sitcom orders in television history.

Production
Castle Rock Entertainment produced Seinfeld and Columbia Pictures Television and Columbia TriStar Television distributed the series. Seinfeld was aired on NBC in the US. Larry David was the main show runner, the person who is responsible for the day-to-day operations, for this season, and one of the producers. Larry David and Jerry Seinfeld wrote most of the season, with Matt Goldman writing episode three, "The Robbery". The season was directed by Art Wolff and Tom Cherones.

The show features Jerry Seinfeld as himself, Jason Alexander as George Costanza, Julia Louis-Dreyfus as Elaine Benes, and Michael Richards as Kramer. In the pilot, Lee Garlington appears as Claire, the waitress at Pete's Luncheonette, but after the pilot the "gang" started eating at Monk's Cafe. Garlington was set to appear as one of the main supporting characters. Her role was dropped when it was decided that there was no need for a regular female waitress. The character of Claire was replaced with Elaine Benes in the second episode. Jerry refers to Kramer as Kessler; however, his name was changed to Kramer for the rest of the series. Kramer was named after a real person; he was called "Kessler" in the pilot episode because of worries about the rights to use the name.

Reception
The pilot was met with poor responses from test audiences, and NBC decided not to pick up the show. Believing it had potential, NBC executive Rick Ludwin ordered four episodes about a year after NBC's rejection. The first aired on May 31, 1990. When the pilot was first repeated on July 5, 1990, it received a rating of 13.9/26, meaning that 13.9% of households were tuned in at any given moment; additionally, 26% of all televisions in use at the time were tuned into it. These ratings were high enough to secure a second season. NBC research showed that the show was popular with young male adults, a demographic sought by advertisers, giving NBC an incentive to continue the show. The episode "The Stake Out" was nominated for a Writer's Guild Award.

Retrospective reception of the season has been positive. The review aggregator website Rotten Tomatoes reported a 76% approval rating with an average rating of 8.1/10, based on 29 critic reviews. The website's critics consensus reads, "Seinfelds first season lays out the template for the show's unique style, effectively outlining the hugless, lesson-free humor that would later make it an oft-imitated classic." On Metacritic, it received a weighted mean score of 78/100, indicating "generally favorable reviews." TV Guide ranked it the twenty second greatest television season of all time, being one of four of the series's entries on the list.

Episodes

References
General sources
 
 
 
Specific sources and notes

External links

 
 
 

1
1989 American television seasons
1990 American television seasons